Francesco Saverio Altamura (5 August 1822 – 5 January 1897) was an Italian painter, known for Romantic style canvases depicting mainly historical events.

Biography

He was born in Foggia, but moved to Naples in 1840, initially with the aim to study medicine. He was enrolled in the school of the Scolopi priests. But his interests led him to attend the Accademia di Belle Arti alongside Domenico Morelli. he also befriended Michele De Napoli. But like his friend, he became part of the protests during the insurrection of 1848. He fought in the barricades of Santa Brigida. He was briefly arrested, and condemned to death, and upon which he fled into exile in L'Aquila, then by 1850 to Florence. There he entered into the circle of artists frequenting the Caffè Michelangiolo, and the painters of the Tuscan school of the Macchiaioli. Yet Francesco's paintings, unlike those of the Macchiaioli, were focused on historic and political events.

In 1855, with Morelli and  Serafino De Tivoli, he traveled to the World Exposition at Paris. In 1860, he returned to Naples, this time fighting alongside the forces of Giuseppe Garibaldi. He then became active in politics as well as art. In 1861, he submitted the painting of the Funeral of Buondelmonte to the "Prima esposizione nazionale" held in Florence.

In 1865, he frescoed the chapel of the Palazzo Reale of Naples. In 1892, he painted five altarpieces and four canvases for the restored parish church of  Castrignano de' Greci in the province of Lecce.

His first wife, Elena Bùkuras, was a Greek painter, with whom he had three children, a daughter, Sofia, and two sons who became painters Ioannis and Alessandro. But he then had two further companions, the Greek painter  Eleni Sionti, and finally the painter Jane Benham Hay, with whom he had a son, painter Bernardo Hay. Among the pupils of Altamura was Vincenzo Acquaviva.

Francesco died in Naples. In 1901, a monument in his honor was erected in Foggia.

References
Translated from Italian Wikipedia entry

19th-century Italian painters
Italian male painters
1822 births
1897 deaths
Painters from Naples
Painters from Tuscany
Accademia di Belle Arti di Napoli alumni
People from Foggia
19th-century Italian male artists